João Leonardo de Paula Reginato (born 25 June 1985), or simply João Leonardo, is a Brazilian football central defender, who plays for Digenis Akritas Morphou FC.

Career
He made his professional debut with Atlético Paranaense in 3-2 home victory against Paysandu in Campeonato Brasileiro on November 27, 2005.

In June 2019 it was confirmed, that Leonardo had joined Cypriot club Digenis Akritas Morphou FC.

Contract
Tombense: December 14, 2008 to December 31, 2011
 → Fortaleza (loan): September 1, 2009 to December 1, 2009

References

External links
 
  CBF

1985 births
Living people
Sportspeople from Campinas
Brazilian footballers
Brazil under-20 international footballers
Cypriot First Division players
Guarani FC players
Club Athletico Paranaense players
Esporte Clube Juventude players
Grêmio Barueri Futebol players
Fortaleza Esporte Clube players
Tombense Futebol Clube players
Ituano FC players
Paraná Clube players
São Bernardo Futebol Clube players
Marília Atlético Clube players
Doxa Katokopias FC players
Aris Limassol FC players
Enosis Neon Paralimni FC players
Expatriate footballers in Cyprus
Brazilian expatriate footballers
Brazilian expatriate sportspeople in Cyprus
Association football defenders
Olympiakos Nicosia players